The Cascais Women's Pro Portugal 2015 was an event organized by the Association of Surfing Professionals for the 2015 ASP World Tour. This event was held from 22 to 28 September at Cascais, (Portugal) and was contested by 18 surfers.

The tournament was won by C. Conlogue (USA), who beat Lakey Peterson (USA) in final.

Round 1

Round 2

Round 3

Round 4

Quarter finals

Semi finals

Final

References

2015 World Surf League
2015 in Portuguese sport
Sport in Cascais
Women's surfing